Keshav Prasad Maurya (born 7 May 1969) is the Deputy Chief Minister of Uttar Pradesh. He is a member of the Bharatiya Janata Party.

Life
On 8 April 2016, on the first day of Chaitra, he was appointed the Bharatiya Janata Party chief of Uttar Pradesh. A member of the Rashtriya Swayamsevak Sangh, he also participated in the Ram Janmabhoomi movement. Born in 1969, in Sirathu in Kausambhi district, adjoining Allahabad, Maurya went on to study Hindi Literature at the Hindu Sahitya Sammelan in Allahabad.

Political career
Maurya has been associated with the RSS and the VHP-Bajrang Dal from an early age, holding the posts of Nagar Karyawah and VHP Pranth Sanghathan Mantri, among others. While being active in the gauraksha (cow-protection) movements. He also participated in the Ram Janmabhoomi movement. In the BJP, Maurya has been the regional (Kashi) coordinator of the backward class cell and the BJP Kisan Morcha. He has contested the 2002, 2007 and 2012 assembly elections, he lost 2002 and 2007 elections but won 2012, and was the sitting MLA from Sirathu assembly constituency before getting elected as MP from the Phulpur seat in 2014 with a thumping five lakh votes and over 52 per cent votes. In April 2016, he was made the state president of BJP in Uttar Pradesh. Under his leadership, the BJP registered a historic victory in the 2017 Uttar Pradesh Legislative Assembly election. After the election results were out, he was considered a strong contender for the post of Chief Minister. On 18 March 2017, he was appointed the deputy chief minister of Uttar Pradesh.

He became the first MLA of BJP from Sirathu Tahseel in the year 2012. It was the first time when any MLA of BJP was elected from Sirathu Tahseel. And after two and half-years he became the MP from Phoolpur from BJP. He got the ministries of public works department (PWD), food processing, entertainment tax and public enterprises department.

Uttar Pradesh Assembly Election 2022
In the 2022 Uttar Pradesh Legislative Assembly election Keshav Prasad Maurya contested from Sirathu seat in his home district Kaushambi and lost to Samajwadi Party candidate Pallavi Patel.

References

|-

1969 births
Living people
Rashtriya Swayamsevak Sangh members
Vishva Hindu Parishad members
Bharatiya Janata Party politicians from Uttar Pradesh
India MPs 2014–2019
Lok Sabha members from Uttar Pradesh
People from Lucknow district
Uttar Pradesh MLAs 2017–2022
Deputy chief ministers of Uttar Pradesh
Yogi ministry
Members of the Uttar Pradesh Legislative Council
Politicians from Allahabad